is a former Japanese football player.

Playing career
Otani was born in Ibaraki Prefecture on December 6, 1980. He joined Japan Football League (JFL) club Mito HollyHock based in his local from Joso Identy youth team in 1999. The club was promoted to J2 League from 2000. Although he played several matches ever season until 2001, he could not play many matches. In 2002, he moved to Prefectural Leagues club Joso Identy. In 2003, he moved to Regional Leagues club FC Horikoshi. The club was promoted to JFL from 2004. In September 2005, he moved to Joso Identy again. He retired end of 2014 season.

Club statistics

References

External links

1980 births
Living people
Association football people from Ibaraki Prefecture
Japanese footballers
J2 League players
Japan Football League players
Mito HollyHock players
Arte Takasaki players
Association football midfielders